Systoloneura geometropis is a species of moth of the family Gracillariidae. It is known from Hong Kong, Taiwan and Japan (Honshū, Kyūshū, Satunan and Shikoku).

The wingspan is 4.5–6.2 mm.

The larvae feed on Gardenia augusta, Gardenia jasminoides and Gardenia radicans. There are four instars in larval period, the first two are of sap-feeding type with a flat head, and the last two are of tissue-feeding type with a round head and a cylindrical body as in Aristaea species. First instar larva mine the lower layer of spongy parenchymal tissues and makes a short linear mine along the vein. A short time after it broadens the mine into a blotch. In the second instar, it continues to make a blotch-mine, which finally occupies a more or less full area between two branching veins. In the third and fourth instars the larva, with tissue-feeding mouthparts, feeds on the remaining tissues within the blotch-mine. When fully grown, it leaves the mine through an exit hole to pupate. In this stage the mine is tentiformed,
with a strong longitudinal wrinkle on the lower side. Pupation takes place inside a whitish, boat-shaped cocoon which is usually located on the lower surface of the leaf near the apex. At the spinning site the leaf is always folded downwardly.

References

Gracillariinae
Moths of Japan
Moths described in 1936